Uragi (Dargwa: Урагъи) is a rural locality (a selo) and the administrative centre of Uraginsky Selsoviet, Dakhadayevsky District, Republic of Dagestan, Russia. The population was 319 as of 2010. There are 4 streets.

Geography 
Uragi is located 25 km southwest of Urkarakh (the district's administrative centre) by road. Dzilebki and Urtsaki are the nearest rural localities.

Nationalities 
Dargins live there.

References 

Rural localities in Dakhadayevsky District